Jagpal Singh  is an Indian politician and  member of the 13th, 15th and the 16th Legislative Assembly of Uttar Pradesh of India. He represents the Saharanpur constituency of Uttar Pradesh and is a member of the BSP political party.

Early life and education
Jagpal Singh was born in district of Saharanpur, Uttar Pradesh. His highest attained educational qualification is Intermediate.

Political career
Jagpal has been a MLA for three terms. In the 16th Legislative Assembly, he represents Saharanpur (Assembly constituency). In 2007, during the 15th Legislative Assembly, he represented Harora constituency which was earlier contested by Mayawati. He was also a member of the 13th Legislative Assembly of Uttar Pradesh.

Posts Held

See also

Saharanpur (Assembly constituency)
Uttar Pradesh Legislative Assembly
Government of India
Politics of India
Bahujan Samaj Party

References 

Bahujan Samaj Party politicians from Uttar Pradesh
1960 births
Living people
Uttar Pradesh MLAs 2012–2017
Uttar Pradesh MLAs 2007–2012
Bharatiya Janata Party politicians from Uttar Pradesh